Lydia is an unincorporated community in Spring Lake Township, Scott County, Minnesota, United States.

The community is located south-southwest of the city of Prior Lake near the junction of Langford Avenue (Highway 13) and Scott County Road 10. Author Cora Sutton Castle (1880-1966) was born at Lydia.

Nearby places include Jordan and Prior Lake.

References

Unincorporated communities in Minnesota
Unincorporated communities in Scott County, Minnesota